Monique Gabriela Curnen (born September 7, 1970) is an American actress.

Early life and education
Curnen was born on September 7, 1970. Her mother is from Puerto Rico, and her father is of German and Irish descent. She grew up in Framingham, Massachusetts and went to Williams College, where she concentrated on other studies. After college, she spent a year (1992–93) as a full-time intern at Unity House, the Minority Cultural Center, at Connecticut College in New London. She then moved to New York and started taking acting classes and going to auditions.

Career
Curnen has appeared in several films including Bollywood Calling (2001), Half Nelson (2006) and The Dark Knight (2008), in which she played corrupt Police Detective Anna Ramirez. She also played the colleague of Paul Walker's character Brian O'Connor in Fast & Furious (2009) in a cameo.

She has also appeared in numerous television series including Dexter (in the season 1 episodes "Let's Give the Boy a Hand" and "Love American Style"), House M.D. (in the episode "House Training", 2007) and Law & Order: Special Victims Unit (in the episode "Quickie", 2010). She played Detective Allison Beaumont in the 2009 police procedural drama series The Unusuals. She has appeared on the television series Sons of Anarchy, playing Amelia Dominguez. She appeared in the season finale of Season 2 of Lie to Me ("Black and White", 2010) as Detective Sharon Wallowski, whom she continued to play in Season 3 in a major recurring role. She appeared in a 2014 episode of the TV Series Person of Interest as Precinct Captain Moreno, and two episodes in Season 4 of the television series Elementary as Detective Gina Cortes and then in The Mentalist as Tamsin Wade in the fifth season. Curnen joined the main cast for the final (2019–20) season of the Starz television series Power, playing Detective Blanca Rodriguez.

Filmography

Film

Television

Video games

References

External links

 
 Monique Curnen at DVRepublic (2006-02-16)

1970 births
Living people
20th-century American actresses
21st-century American actresses
American film actresses
American people of German descent
American people of Irish descent
American people of Puerto Rican descent
American television actresses
People from Framingham, Massachusetts
Williams College alumni